Robert Cale Clark (born June 13, 1955) is a former American professional baseball player who played seven seasons for the California Angels and Milwaukee Brewers of Major League Baseball (MLB).

Career
Clark attended the University of California, Riverside, where he played college baseball for the Highlanders in 1974.

References

External links
, or Retrosheet, or Pura Pelota

1955 births
Living people
American expatriate baseball players in Canada
Baseball players from Sacramento, California
California Angels players
Edmonton Trappers players
El Paso Diablos players
Idaho Falls Angels players
Major League Baseball outfielders
Milwaukee Brewers players
Quad Cities Angels players
Riverside City Tigers baseball players
Salinas Angels players
Salt Lake City Gulls players
San Jose Bees players
Tacoma Tigers players
Tiburones de La Guaira players
American expatriate baseball players in Venezuela
UC Riverside Highlanders baseball players
University of California, Riverside alumni
Vancouver Canadians players